Alf Torp (born 30 August 1960) is a Norwegian rower. He competed in the men's coxed four event at the 1976 Summer Olympics.

References

External links
 
 

1960 births
Living people
Norwegian male rowers
Olympic rowers of Norway
Rowers at the 1976 Summer Olympics
Rowers from Oslo